Missing U is a 2013 short animated film made by Brooke Wagstaff which was featured in multiple film festivals.

Plot
A 3D animated adventure that follows the letter I as she travels great distances to find her missing U.

Production
The film was created by Wagstaff over the span of a year and a half while she was a student at the Ringling College of Art and Design. She made it for her senior thesis while pursuing a degree in Computer Animation. It was created using the 3D computer graphics software Autodesk Maya but styled to mimic a variety of traditional techniques such as hand-drawn animation and claymation. The film was made only using resources available through the school.

Festivals and Honors

References

External links
Official Website

2013 animated films
2010s animated short films
Computer-animated short films
American animated short films
American student films
2013 films
2010s English-language films
2010s American films